PT Palindo Marine or PT Palindo Marine Shipyard (PMS) is a shipyard which is located on the island of Batam, Indonesia and nearest to Singapore.

Products from PT Palindo Marine include patrol boats, passenger ferries, rescue boats, barges and various vessels made of steel, aluminium, GFRP and a combination of steel and aluminium.

Background 
PT Palindo Marine in Batam, Riau Islands Province is an Indonesian company that has been producing fast boats and ferries since 2007. PT Palindo Marine's shipyard is located on the Sei Lekop island of Tanjung Uncang Batam, Indonesia and near Singapore. Products from PT Palindo Kelautan include patrol boats, passenger ferries, crew, rescue boats, barges and various ships made of steel, aluminium, GFRP and a combination of steel and aluminium. The customer has given PT Palindo Marine the opportunity and confidence in its ability to produce boats, utilize shipbuilding technology and develop human resources.

The company has more than 500 professional workers in their fields and is supported by shipbuilding industrial production facilities, capable of producing high quality ships. The main customers of shipping companies are in Indonesia, Malaysia, Singapore and Thailand. Government agencies in the country are the Navy, Department of Fisheries, Department of Forestry, The National Search And Rescue Agency, and other agencies.

Naval ships 
Naval ships built by PT Palindo Marine include:

Clurit-class fast attack craft
Tatihu-class patrol boat
Bawean-class patrol boat
Kudungga-class patrol boat
Bireuen-class patrol boat

References 

Defense companies of Indonesia
Indonesian brands
2007 establishments in Indonesia
Shipbuilding companies of Indonesia